Roots & Wings is a digitally released EP from Christian folk/rock group Jars of Clay, which preceded the release of their 2005 studio album, Redemption Songs. The track "What Wondrous Love" is a B-side from the Redemption Songs recording sessions, while "Shipwrecked" and "Tonight" are B-sides from the recording sessions of Who We Are Instead. The latter two tracks can also be found on the bonus disc that was released with the limited-edition version of Who We Are Instead.

Track listing
All songs by Jars of Clay .

Jars of Clay EPs
2005 EPs
Essential Records (Christian) EPs